John R. Grout is an American educator who serves as Dean of the Campbell School of Business at Berry College. He received a B.S. from Brigham Young University's Marriott School of Management in 1984, receiving the Operations/Systems Award for being the highest ranked graduating senior in his major. After working a few years for Signetics, Grout returned to school, earning a Ph.D. in management science from Pennsylvania State University in 1990. After graduation, Grout worked at Southern Methodist University from 1990 to 1997, subsequently accepting a position at Berry College.

Some of Grout's most notable research focuses on the Japanese term poka-yoke, or "mistake-proofing". In May 2004, Grout received the Shingo Prize for Manufacturing Excellence in Research in connection with research in this field. Grout and his wife, Susan, have four children.

References

External links 
Grout's Poka-Yoke page
Grout's Mistake-Proofing site

1959 births
Living people
Berry College faculty
Brigham Young University alumni
Smeal College of Business alumni